Susie Harries is a British historian.

Career 

She studied classics and classical philosophy at Newnham College, Cambridge and St Anne's College, Oxford.

She is a winner of the Wolfson History Prize 2012 for her book Nikolaus Pevsner: The Life about architectural historian Nikolaus Pevsner.

Personal life 
She is married to Meirion Harries and lives in London.

Bibliography 
  Nikolaus Pevsner: The Life 
 The Last Days of Innocence: America at War, 1917-1918 (Random House, 1997) 
 A Pilgrim Soul 
 Soldiers of the Sun: The Rise and Fall of the Imperial Japanese Army 
 Sheathing the Sword: The Demilitarization of Japan 
 Opera Today

References

External links
 

21st-century British historians
British women historians
1951 births
Living people
20th-century British historians
21st-century British women writers
20th-century British women writers